is a railway station in the city of Hirosaki, Aomori Prefecture, Japan, operated by the private railway operator, Kōnan Railway Company

Lines
Ishikawa Station is served by the Kōnan Railway Ōwani Line, and lies 4.4 kilometers from the southern terminus of the line at Ōwani Station.

Station layout
The station has one island platform. There is no station building, but only a weather shelter on the platform. The station is unattended.

Platforms

Adjacent stations

History
It was renamed to its present name on April 1, 1986.

Surrounding area
It is located approximately a kilometer away from the JR East Ishikawa Station on the Ōu Main Line.

See also
 List of railway stations in Japan

External links

Kōnan Railway home page 
 Location map  

Railway stations in Aomori Prefecture
Konan Railway
Hirosaki
Railway stations in Japan opened in 1952